WDTV (channel 5) is a television station licensed to Weston, West Virginia, United States, serving as the CBS affiliate for North-Central West Virginia. It is owned by Gray Television alongside Clarksburg-licensed dual Fox/CW+ affiliate WVFX (channel 10). The two stations share studios on Television Drive in Bridgeport (along I-79/Jennings Randolph Expressway); WDTV's transmitter is located in an unincorporated area between Clarksburg and Arlington.

History
It signed on as WJPB-TV on March 17, 1954, as the second television station in the market licensed to Fairmont. WJPB was a primary NBC affiliate but maintained secondary relations with ABC and CBS. WTAP-TV in Parkersburg was technically the area's first outlet having launched October 8, 1953. That station cleared programming from NBC, CBS, and ABC but was intended to be a primary NBC outlet. Originally, there were plans calling for WJPB to join WTAP (located 70 miles to the west) and turn North-Central West Virginia into one large market. However, the latter's analog signal on UHF channel 15 was not strong enough to reach across the very rugged dissected plateau to provide Fairmont, Clarksburg, and Weston with adequate reception. Likewise, WJPB's analog signal on UHF channel 35 did not reach Parkersburg.

Those two issues, combined with the fact UHF converters were very expensive, led the station to shut down on February 28, 1955. Meanwhile, the area's third station WBOY-TV signed on from Clarksburg on November 17, 1957. That was originally intended to be the ABC affiliate for all of North-Central West Virginia. After it became clear Clarksburg/Weston/Fairmont and Parkersburg were going to be separate markets, WBOY joined NBC and remains with the network to this day. On December 30, 1959, WJPB's owner was awarded a construction permit for an analog signal on the more desirable VHF channel 5. It signed back on in June 1960 as a sole ABC affiliate licensed to Weston. In 1965, the station changed its call letters to WDTV. The calls had previously been used from 1949 until 1954 on what is now CBS O&O KDKA-TV in Pittsburgh. The call sign was reportedly chosen for use on this West Virginia outlet "in honor" of KDKA which had been a charter affiliate with DuMont and served as the default station to Clarksburg/Weston/Fairmont.

In 1967, WDTV switched primary affiliation to CBS. As a result, it is one of the few TV stations in the country that has held a primary affiliation with all "Big Three" networks. However, for many years it continued sharing ABC with WBOY and aired select sports programming from the network since the market was one of the few in the country without a primary ABC affiliate. The area's cable companies imported WTAE-TV from Pittsburgh (which already served the Morgantown area) to bring the full ABC schedule to the area. At some point in 1981, WDTV dropped all ABC programming. The network would not return to a Clarksburg–Weston–Fairmont based station until August 1, 2008 when WBOY launched a new second digital subchannel to offer the network. WDTV aired programming from UPN on its second digital subchannel until September 18, 2006 when the network merged with The WB to form The CW. WVFX, at the time owned separately from this station, became an affiliate with the new combined service (through The CW Plus) on a second digital subchannel.

In 2007, WVFX's owner, Davis Television, sold that station to Withers Broadcasting. Since the Clarksburg–Weston–Fairmont market has only five full-powered stations, this amount is too few to allow a duopoly under normal Federal Communications Commission (FCC) guidelines. However, Withers obtained a "failed station" waiver allowing the purchase to go through. Gray Television announced on May 13, 2016, that it would acquire WDTV and WVFX for $26.5 million. Gray assumed control of the stations through a local marketing agreement on June 1. The sale was completed on May 1, 2017.

The northern West Virginia television market geography is unusual, as Monongalia County (including Morgantown) and Preston County are assigned to the Pittsburgh market. Although WDTV has been carried on cable in Morgantown since 1965, none of the Clarksburg–Weston–Fairmont market stations were available on satellite in those counties, as the FCC would not allow satellite providers to carry them. A change in the law removed this restriction; one of the stated goals was to allow "orphan counties" served on satellite only by stations from other states to receive stations from their own state. The Monongalia and Preston County governments petitioned to allow carriage of Clarksburg–Weston–Fairmont market stations, and the market change was granted on February 2, 2018.

Programming

Syndicated programming
Syndicated programming on WDTV includes Live with Kelly and Ryan, The Drew Barrymore Show, Entertainment Tonight, Inside Edition, and Judge Judy, among others. The latter four are distributed by CBS Media Ventures.

News operation
WBOY historically leads WDTV in local Nielsen ratings because it operates a news bureau in Morgantown and provides other stations in the West Virginia Media Holdings group with a large amount of sports content relative to West Virginia University. However, in recent years, WDTV has been able to pull ahead in the key demographics for most of their shows, and even beats WBOY in overall viewers at times. In Summer 2005, its newscast operation and commercial production went completely digital using electronic news gathering cameras. The station was also first in West Virginia (and quite possibly the East Coast) to exchange audio and video files through various compression formats and high speed FTP servers.

After acquiring WVFX, WDTV made plans to produce a prime time newscast at 10 on the former. It would be the second time a broadcast has been attempted on the station in its history. In late 2010, the plans became a reality. The show is known as Fox 10 News at 10 and it features the Fox Interactive Media graphics package and music theme. WVFX also simulcasts WDTV's early evening broadcasts on weeknights from 5 until 6:30. This station does not air its weekday morning show for a full two hours unlike most CBS affiliates.

On November 12, 2011, WDTV began airing their news broadcasts in high definition. It makes WDTV the third station in West Virginia to broadcast local news in high definition, following WTAP and WSAZ-TV (which, ironically, are now sister stations of WDTV).

Notable former on-air staff
 Susan Barnett – now at KYW-TV
 Molly Line – now at Fox News Channel
 Dan Potash – now at AT&T SportsNet Pittsburgh
 Christi Paul – now at CNN and HLN

Technical information

Subchannels
The station's digital signal is multiplexed:

Analog-to-digital conversion
WDTV shut down its analog signal, over VHF channel 5, on June 12, 2009, the official date in which full-power television stations in the United States transitioned from analog to digital broadcasts under federal mandate. The station's digital signal relocated from its pre-transition VHF channel 6 to channel 5.

Out-of-market carriage
WDTV is carried as far south as Summersville in the Charleston–Huntington DMA. In the Pittsburgh DMA, it is carried in Morgantown, Markleysburg, Pennsylvania) and Oakland, Maryland. In the Harrisonburg DMA, it is carried in Franklin, Pendleton County.

CATV
During the 1970s and possibly into the 1980s, WDTV was once carried in Charleston and surrounding areas. In Charleston, WDTV was available only when WCHS-TV, then the CBS affiliate in the Charleston–Huntington market, did not clear a network program.

References

External links

CBS network affiliates
MeTV affiliates
Heroes & Icons affiliates
DTV
Television channels and stations established in 1954
1954 establishments in West Virginia
Gray Television